Faith Happens is a 2009 Christian film directed by Rick Garside. Garside, who has created many successful films over the last 20+ years, collaborated with singer Pat Boone to make the film after noticing a growing debate regarding the need for churches to have a film featuring what it is like to be part of a church community. Many of Faith Happens''' scenes were shot in the Los Angeles area, but they also filmed in a Kenyan refugee camp, town and National Park.

Cast
Bruce Marchiano as Peter
Peter Husmann as John
Sierra Wingert as Amy
James Wong as Jimmy
Austin Kemie as Masa

ReleaseFaith Happens was released nationwide in South Africa on August 21, 2009 by Ster-Kinekor Theatres.

References

External links
 Official website
 Faith Happens'' at Facebook
 

2009 films
2009 drama films
Films about evangelicalism
American drama films
2000s English-language films
2000s American films